Warren Hue (born June 20, 2002) known professionally as Warren Hue is an Indonesian rapper-singer signed to 88rising.

Career 
Since the age of 16, Warren has created and released music. He started his music career with a remix of Valee's "Womp Womp" posted to SoundCloud in 2018 under the name warrenisyellow and went on to produce and write for Aminé's mixtape OnePointFive and released his debut album Alien later the same year. In December 2020, he became the 4th Indonesian artist to join label 88rising. His first track with the label was Freaks in collaboration with Atarashii Gakko!. He then released the single omomo punk on March 30, 2021, as his debut song with the label. Microsoft AI-powered never-ending remix of Hue's single Too Many Tears.

Four of his songs were included in the Shang-Chi soundtrack, including Warriors which features K-pop singer-songwriter Seori. Rich Brian described Warren as "an icon for Asian rap".

He was included in the NME 100 list of essential new artists in 2022. His song omomo punk was selected as the Best Song By An Asian Artist and he was also named as one of the Best New Act From Asia at BandLab NME Awards 2022. In addition, he is also nominated for Best Song In The World at the BandLab NME Awards 2022. He is one of the 25 artists to watch for 2022 by Ones to Watch. He was included in the entertainment and sports category of Forbes’ 30 Under 30 Asia List 2022.

On July 8, 2022, Hue announced his debut 88rising album Boy of the Year, which was released on July 29.

Personal life 
Warren Hue was born and grew up in Jakarta, Indonesia. He then pursued college in New York City and currently lives in Los Angeles, United States to support his music career. He's always been interested in Fashion as his parents both work in the Garment Industry.

Discography

Album

Singles

Features 
 A. Nayaka - "Curtains" (2020)
 III Addicts - "Overconcerned" (2020)
 88rising, Rich Brian, Niki - "California" (2021)
 88rising, Rich Brian, Niki - "California" [Acoustic Live Version] (2021)
 88rising, Rich Brian, Niki - "California" ft. Warren Hue & Jackson Wang [Remix] (2021)
 Rich Brian - "Getcho Mans" (2022; Brightside)

OST 

 Shang-Chi and the Legend of the Ten Rings: The Album ("Warriors" with Seori) (2021)

Reference

External links 

 Warren Hue on YouTube
 Warren Hue on Twitter
 Warren Hue on Instagram

Musicians from Jakarta
21st-century Indonesian male singers
Indonesian people of Chinese descent
Indonesian rappers
English-language singers from Indonesia
2002 births
Living people